Albert Maes (23 October 1906 – 27 October 1986) was a Belgian weightlifter. He competed at the 1924 Summer Olympics and the 1928 Summer Olympics.

References

External links
 

1906 births
1986 deaths
Belgian male weightlifters
Olympic weightlifters of Belgium
Weightlifters at the 1924 Summer Olympics
Weightlifters at the 1928 Summer Olympics
Sportspeople from Antwerp
20th-century Belgian people